Dembia is a village located near the border of Mbomou and Haut-Mbomou Prefecture.

Insurgency 
On 28 March 2010, LRA attacked Dembia. UPDF soldiers chased the LRA fighters and managed to kill fifteen.

On 18 March 2016, LRA bands attacked Dembia. They looted the villagers' properties and abducted seven people, six men and a woman. They were released three days later. The residents, however, had fled to the bush before the attack happened after they heard the presence of the LRA near Dembia. After the attack, they gradually returned to Dembia. Nevertheless, hearing rumors of an LRA attack, they fled to the bush again. They only went back to Dembia at the end of April.

UPC rebels from Zemio attacked Dembia on 20 November 2017. They looted and burned 75% of the houses in Dembia. Moreover, they massacred 46 people, 44 men, and 2 women. As a result, the villagers fled to Rafai, Bangassou, and Congo DR. Those who fled to Congo DR returned to the village at the end of April 2019.

Facilities 
Dembia has one public health center and a school.

References 

Populated places in Mbomou